Captina may refer to:

Captina, Ohio, an unincorporated community
Captina, West Virginia, a community in Marshall County
Captina Creek, a creek in Belmont and Monroe Counties, Ohio
Captina Island, an island on the Ohio River in Marshall County, West Virginia